Yaya Sanogo (born 27 January 1993) is a French professional footballer who plays as a striker for Armenian Premier League club Urartu. He has also played for Auxerre, Arsenal and Toulouse, and spent loan spells with Crystal Palace, Ajax, Charlton Athletic and Huddersfield Town. He is a French youth international, and was a member of the side that won the 2013 FIFA U-20 World Cup.

Club career

Auxerre 
Sanogo was born in Massy, Essonne. After failing to earn selection into the prestigious Clairefontaine academy, Sanogo joined another local Parisian club CO Les Ulis, the same club that produced France national team's Thierry Henry. He spent only a year at the club before being signed up on an aspirant (youth) contract with first division club Auxerre at age 13. Sanogo quickly established himself in the club's youth system scoring 25 goals in 14 matches and also providing 17 assists in the 2006–07 edition of the Championnat Federal des 14 ans. While playing with the under-16 team, the following season, in the Championnat National des 16 ans, Sanogo averaged a goal a game. Alongside his positive displays domestically, Sanogo's prolific scoring on the international stage led to him being declared Auxerre's best overall prospect. He drew the interest of Premier League clubs Arsenal and Tottenham Hotspur before signing his first professional contract for three years on 27 October 2009.

Sanogo was not immediately promoted to the senior team and, instead, began the season playing in the Championnat National des 18 ans with the Auxerre under-18 team. On 10 October 2009, Sanogo was promoted to the team's Championnat de France Amateur team making his debut in a 2–1 loss to Pontivy. He scored his first CFA goal two weeks later in a 3–2 defeat to Romorantin. The following week, he netted again, this time with Auxerre earning a 1–0 victory over Sénart-Moissy. On 5 December, the youngster converted a hat trick against Viry-Châtillon in a 6–2 victory. The three-goal display positioned him as the team's top scorer, despite being only 16 years of age. On 24 January 2010, Auxerre manager Jean Fernandez named Sanogo to the team's squad to participate in a Coupe de France match against Sedan to be played on 26 January, a day before his 17th birthday. He was assigned the number 19 shirt. Sanogo made his professional debut in the match appearing as a substitute in the 108th minute. Auxerre won the match 3–0 on penalties after the match ended 1–1 in regular time and extra time. On 5 May 2010, Sanogo made his league debut appearing as a substitute in a 2–1 loss to Lyon.

Sanogo began the 2010–11 campaign playing with the club's reserve team in the fourth division. On 18 September 2010, while playing in a league match against Mulhouse, Sanogo suffered a fractured tibia in a 2–0 win. Two days later, the injury was confirmed by the club and the player was slated to miss an estimated five months.

Sanogo made his return to professional football at the start of the 2011–12 season making his first appearance of the campaign in a 2–1 win over Nancy in the Coupe de la Ligue. On 21 September 2011, he made his first league appearance in over 17 months appearing as a substitute in a 1–1 draw with Lorient. Four days later, Sanogo made his first professional start in a 2–1 win over Sochaux. On 6 November, he scored his first professional goal, netting the opener in a 2–0 win over Toulouse.

Arsenal 

On 1 July 2013, it was confirmed that Sanogo had signed a long-term contract at Arsenal of the Premier League. On 5 July, Arsenal announced on its official Twitter account that Sanogo would be taking the number 22 for the 2013–14 season. The number had been used previously by Francis Coquelin, who was loaned out to SC Freiburg for the season.

On 24 August, Sanogo made his competitive debut for Arsenal against Fulham at Craven Cottage in which he came on in the 81st minute for Lukas Podolski as the Gunners went on to win the match 3–1.

Sanogo picked up a back injury during international duty with the France U21 side in mid-September and was ruled out for several weeks. Despite not playing for Arsenal since picking up the injury, Sanogo was nominated for the Golden Boy Award 2013.

On 16 February 2014, he made his first start for Arsenal in a 2–1 FA Cup win against Liverpool. His performance was praised by club manager Arsène Wenger who showed his delight and appraised Sanogo's performance as "excellent." On 20 February, Sanogo made his UEFA Champions League debut in the round-of-16 home leg against Bayern Munich. On 12 April, he played 120 minutes as Arsenal beat Wigan Athletic on penalties in the FA Cup semi-final at Wembley Stadium. On 17 May, Sanogo came on as a substitute for German international Lukas Podolski in the 2014 FA Cup Final against Hull City as Arsenal won the trophy for the first time since 2005.

During pre-season, Sanogo scored four goals in Arsenal's 5–1 win over Benfica in the Emirates Cup on 2 August 2014. On 10 August, he started as Arsenal's lone striker in the 2014 FA Community Shield, against Manchester City; he was replaced by Olivier Giroud at half time in the 3–0 win at Wembley Stadium. On 26 November, he scored his only competitive goal for Arsenal, opening a 2–0 home win over Borussia Dortmund in the second minute of the game. The result put Arsenal into the knockout stage with a game left to play.

Sanogo was loaned to fellow Premier League club Crystal Palace on 13 January 2015, for the rest of the season. He was the first signing for them by Alan Pardew, who promised him more playing time. Four days later, he started in a 3–2 away win at Burnley. Sanogo scored his first goal for the club on 24 January as they beat Southampton by the same score away in the FA Cup fourth round.

On 17 July 2015, Sanogo completed a year-long loan switch to Eredivisie club Ajax. Sanogo made his professional debut for Ajax in the 2015–16 UEFA Champions League third qualifying round away match against SK Rapid Wien on 29 July 2015 which ended in a 2–2 draw. He made his regular season debut in the season opener on 9 August 2015 against AZ which ended in a 3–0 away win. He scored his first goals for Ajax in a friendly match on 10 August 2015 against Umm Salal SC from Qatar. The match ended in a 6–1 win for Ajax, with Sanogo scoring a hat-trick with goals in the 6th, 17th and 35th minutes of the match. Despite this hat trick in a pre-season friendly, he received the rather unflattering nickname Yaya Sanogoal from the Ajax fans.

On 1 February 2016, Sanago signed with Championship club Charlton Athletic on loan until the end of the season. He scored his only goals for Charlton in the form of a hat-trick in a 3–4 loss against Reading at The Valley on 27 February.

Toulouse 
On 7 July 2017, following his release from Arsenal, Sanogo returned to France to join Ligue 1 side Toulouse on a three-year deal. In his first season, he scored six goals, including two late strikes in a 2–2 home draw with RC Strasbourg on 17 March. On 23 May, he netted in a 3–0 playoff final win at Ajaccio as his club stayed up.

On 7 July 2020, Sanogo was released by Toulouse. He achieved 16 goals in 70 competitive games, second to Max Gradel for the club over the three seasons.

Huddersfield Town
On 24 February 2021, Sanogo joined English Championship side Huddersfield Town on a deal until the end of the 2020–21 season. On 11 May 2021, it was confirmed that his contract would not be extended, and he departed the Terriers after nine appearances.

As of June 2022, he was still actively searching for a new club.

Urartu
On 27 January 2023, Armenian Premier League club Urartu announced the signing of Sanogo.

International career 
Born in France, Sanogo is of Ivorian descent. Sanogo has earned caps with the under-16 and under-17 teams of France. With the under-16s, Sanogo was installed as first-choice striker and scored a remarkable 18 goals in 18 games. Sanogo's notable goals during the season include a brace against Uruguay in the Tournoi du Val-de-Marne, a hat-trick against Australia and a brace against Mali in the Tournio de Montaigu, and a goal against Germany in a match that was played at the Olympic Stadium in Berlin. At the 2009 Aegean Cup, Sanogo scored a tournament-leading five goals. He scored a hat trick against Belgium in a group stage match and also scored the game-winning goal in the final against Norway, which France won 2–1.

Due to the six-month suspension of international teammate Paul Pogba, Sanogo was named captain of the under-17 team by coach Guy Ferrier and continued his spectacular form scoring a brace against Belgium in the Toto Cup in Austria. He later relinquished the captaincy in the new year giving it to Lille defender Jérémy Obin. In qualification for the 2010 UEFA European Under-17 Football Championship, Sanogo scored goals against Slovenia and Estonia, earning a brace against the latter to help the team qualify for the Elite Round portion of qualifying. Due to suffering a broken forearm while training with Auxerre, Sanogo missed the Elite Round portion, though France still qualified for the UEFA-sanction tournament without him. In the competition, Sanogo went scoreless in the first two group stage matches. In the final group stage match against Switzerland, he scored a brace in a span of four minutes in a 3–1 victory. The positive result inserted France into the semi-finals, where the team was defeated by England.

Sanogo bypassed the under-18 team and earned his first call up to the under-19 team in August 2010 to play in the Sendai Cup. In the tournament, Sanogo played in all three matches and, in the team's final group stage match against Brazil, scored a goal that was voted the goal of the tournament by the competition's organizing committee. Sanogo, himself, described the goal as "the best goal of my career". After suffering as fractured tibia domestically, he missed significant time with the team, but returned in May 2011 for Elite Round qualification for the 2011 UEFA European Under-19 Football Championship. Sanogo appeared in all three group stage matches as France failed to qualifying for the competition finishing second in its group. Due to being an underage player during the 2010–11 season, Sanogo remained eligible to represent the under-19 team for the 2011–12 season. In his first appearance of the new campaign, he scored a goal in a 2–2 draw with England at the Limoges Tournament.

Sanogo was a member of the team that won France's first ever FIFA U-20 World Cup. In that tournament held in Turkey, he was in the starting line-up for all of France's matches and he was his country's top scorer in the tournament with a total of four goals.

Career statistics

Honours 
Arsenal
FA Cup: 2013–14
FA Community Shield: 2014

France U20
FIFA U-20 World Cup: 2013

References

External links 

 
 
 
 
 

1993 births
Living people
People from Massy, Essonne
French footballers
French expatriate footballers
France youth international footballers
France under-21 international footballers
French sportspeople of Ivorian descent
Association football forwards
AJ Auxerre players
Arsenal F.C. players
Crystal Palace F.C. players
AFC Ajax players
Jong Ajax players
Charlton Athletic F.C. players
Toulouse FC players
Huddersfield Town A.F.C. players
FC Urartu players
Championnat National 2 players
Ligue 1 players
Ligue 2 players
Premier League players
Eredivisie players
Eerste Divisie players
English Football League players

Expatriate footballers in England
Expatriate footballers in Armenia
Expatriate footballers in the Netherlands
French expatriate sportspeople in England
French expatriate sportspeople in the Netherlands
French expatriate sportspeople in Armenia
Footballers from Essonne
FA Cup Final players
Black French sportspeople